A list of mountain ranges of Pima County, Arizona.

Alphabetical list
Agua Dulce Mountains–Pima County
Ajo Range–Pima County
Alvarez Mountains–Pima County
Artesa Mountains–Pima County
Baboquivari Mountains (Arizona)–Pima County; See: Baboquivari Peak Wilderness
Batamote Mountains–Pima County
Bates Mountains–Pima County
Brownell Mountains–Pima County
Castle Mountains (Arizona)–Pima County
Cerro Colorado Mountains–Pima County
Cimarron Mountains–Pima County
Coyote Mountains (Arizona)–Pima County
Crooked Mountains–Pima County
Diablo Mountains (Arizona)–Pima County
Empire Mountains–Pima County
Gakolik Mountains–Pima County
Granite Mountains (Arizona)–Pima County–see also: Granite Mountain (Arizona)-(Yavapai County)a separate "Granite Mountain" is in s. La Paz County
Growler Mountains–Pima County
John the Baptist Mountains–Pima County
La Lesna Mountains–Pima County
Las Guijas Mountains–Pima County
Little Ajo Mountains–Pima County
Mesquite Mountains (Arizona)–Pima County
North Comobabi Mountains–Pima County
Pozo Redondo Mountains–Pima County
Pozo Verde Mountains–Pima County
Puerto Blanco Mountains–Pima County
Quijotoa Mountains–Pima County
Quinlan Mountains–Pima County
Rincon Mountains–Pima County
Roskruge Mountains–Pima County
San Luis Mountains–Pima County
Santa Catalina Mountains–Pima County, Pinal County
Santa Rita Mountains–Santa Cruz, Pima County
Santa Rosa Mountains (Arizona)–Pima County
Sauceda Mountains–Pima County
Sheridan Mountains–Pima County
Sierra Blanca Mountains–Pima County
Sierra de la Nariz–Pima County
Sierra de Santa Rosa–Pima County
Sierrita Mountains–Pima County
Sikort Chuapo Mountains–Pima County
Silver Bell Mountains–Pima County
Sonoyta Mountains–Pima County
South Comobabi Mountains–Pima County
Tortolita Mountains–Pima County, Pinal County
Tucson Mountains–Pima County, Pinal County
Waterman Mountains–Pima County
West Silver Bell Mountains–Pima County

Madrean Sky Island region

Madrean region Pima County ranges
The regional major and minor mountain regions called Madrean Sky Islands, the sky islands region of southeast Arizona, extreme southwest New Mexico, and northern Sonora, Mexico, the north extension of the Sierra Madre Occidental, the western cordillera of northern and western Mexico. (highest elevation in bold)

Baboquivari Mountains (Arizona)( 7730 )Pima County; See: Baboquivari Peak Wilderness
Pozo Verde Mountains( 4885 )
Quinlan Mountains( 5014 )(on eastern border of Sonoran Desert region-(extension north of Baboquivari Mountains))
Rincon Mountains–( 8664 )
San Luis Mountains( 5369 )
Santa Catalina Mountains–( 9157 )–Pima County, Pinal County
Santa Rita Mountains–( 9453 )–Santa Cruz County, Pima County
Tortolita Mountains( 4652 )(both in Madrean sky island region, and also on border of Sonoran Desert ranges-(northeast Madrean))(Minor ranges: Cerro Colorado Mountains and San Luis Mountains on western border of the Madreans)

See also
List of mountain ranges of the Sonoran Desert
List of Madrean Sky Island mountain ranges - Sonoran - Chihuahuan Deserts

References

Pima County, Arizona
Arizona, Pima County, List of mountain ranges of

Mountain ranges